Taylor Branch (born January 14, 1947) is an American author and historian who wrote a Pulitzer Prize winning trilogy chronicling the life of Martin Luther King Jr. and much of the history of the American civil rights movement. The final volume of the 2,912-page trilogy, collectively called America in the King Years, was released in January 2006, and an abridgment, The King Years: Historic Moments in the Civil Rights Movement, was published in 2013.

Biography

Early life and education
Branch graduated from The Westminster Schools in Atlanta in 1964. From there, he went to the University of North Carolina at Chapel Hill on a Morehead Scholarship. He graduated in 1968 and went on to earn an M.P.A. from the Woodrow Wilson School of Public and International Affairs at Princeton University in 1970.

Career

Branch served as an assistant editor at The Washington Monthly from 1970 to 1973; he was Washington editor of Harper's from 1973 to 1976;
and he was Washington columnist for Esquire Magazine from 1976 to 1977. He also has written for a variety of other publications, including The New York Times Magazine, Sport, The New Republic, and Texas Monthly.

In 1972, Branch worked for the Texas campaign of Democratic presidential nominee George McGovern. Branch shared an apartment in Austin with Bill Clinton, and the two developed a friendship that continues today. He also worked with Hillary Rodham, Bill's then-girlfriend and Yale Law School classmate, and later Clinton's wife.

Branch's book on former president Bill Clinton, The Clinton Tapes: Wrestling History With The President, was written from many tape-recorded interviews and conversations between the two, most of which occurred in the White House during Clinton's two terms in office and which were not disclosed publicly until 2009 at the time of the book's publication.

Branch was a lecturer in politics and history at Goucher College from 1998 to 2000.

Taylor Branch received a five-year MacArthur Foundation Fellowship (also known as a "genius grant") in 1991 and the National Humanities Medal in 1999.  In 2008, he received the Dayton Literary Peace Prize's Lifetime Achievement Award, presented to him by special guest Edwin C. Moses.

In 2013, he co-produced Schooled: The Price of College Sports based on his 2011 book The Cartel.

in 2015, he received the BIO Award from Biographers International Organization, for his contributions to the art and craft of biography.

Israeli citizenship controversy
A group of Black Hebrew Israelites described as a cult in The New York Times were systematically denied Israeli citizenship over several decades. In 1981, a group of American civil rights activists led by Bayard Rustin investigated and concluded that racism was likely not the cause of the Black Hebrews' treatment. In 1992, Branch opined that the Black Hebrew Israelites' denial of citizenship under the Israeli law of return was because of alleged anti-Black sentiment among Israeli Jews. In 1998, Branch was criticized by Seth Forman, who said Branch's claims seemed to be baseless, particularly in light of Israel's airlift of thousands of black Ethiopian Jews in the early 1990s.

Family
Branch lives in Baltimore, Maryland, with his wife, Christina Macy, and their two children, Macy (born 1980) and Franklin (born 1983).

Books
 Blowing the Whistle: Dissent in the Public Interest (with Charles Peters) (Praeger: 1972)
 Second Wind (with  Bill Russell) (Random House: 1979)
 The Empire Blues (fiction) (Simon & Schuster: 1981)
 Labyrinth (with Eugene M. Propper): (Viking: 1982, Penguin Books: 1983)
 Parting the Waters: America in the King Years, 1954-63 (Simon & Schuster: 1988)
Pulitzer Prize for History, 1989
National Book Critics Circle Award for General Nonfiction, 1988
English-Speaking Union Book Award, 1989
Martin Luther King Memorial Prize, 1989
(Finalist): National Book Award, Nonfiction, 1989
 Pillar of Fire: America in the King Years, 1963-65 (Simon & Schuster: 1998)
American Bar Association, Silver Gavel Award, 1999
Imus Book Award, 1999
The Hillman Prize, 1998
 At Canaan's Edge: America in the King Years, 1965-1968 (Simon & Schuster: 2006)
Heartland Prize for nonfiction, Chicago Tribune, 2006.
 : Wrestling History with the President (Simon & Schuster: 2009)
 The Cartel: Inside the Rise and Imminent Fall of the NCAA (Byliner, 2011)
 The King Years: Historic Moments in the Civil Rights Movement (Simon & Schuster 2013)

References

External links

 
 Inventory of the Taylor Branch Papers, 1865-2005, at the Southern Historical Collection, University of North Carolina at Chapel Hill.

Booknotes interview with Branch on Pillar of Fire: America in the King Years 1963-65, April 12, 1998.
In Depth interview with Branch, February 5, 2006

1947 births
20th-century American historians
20th-century American male writers
21st-century American historians
21st-century American male writers
Living people
Pulitzer Prize for History winners
MacArthur Fellows
Writers from Atlanta
University of Baltimore faculty
University of North Carolina at Chapel Hill alumni
National Humanities Medal recipients
Princeton School of Public and International Affairs alumni
The Westminster Schools alumni
American male non-fiction writers
Historians from Georgia (U.S. state)
Historians of the civil rights movement